Sjenica Airport , also known as Dubinje Airport is a military airport in Serbia, near the town of Sjenica on Pešter plateau. The airport is also near to the mountain resort Zlatar.

History
The airport was built as a military one, and used by Yugoslav army air force. During the 1999 NATO bombing of FR Yugoslavia, it was damaged.

On 27 September 2006, the Military of Serbia announced that it would sell Sjenica Airport meaning that the airport would become public, but this was never materialised.

Future reconstruction
The management of Belgrade Nikola Tesla Airport have visited Sjenica Airport on 18 May 2006, and announced plans of making a project aimed at turning this airport into a public one. The airport will mostly be used for cargo and possible tourist transport. Local companies confirmed their interest for this project.

See also 
 List of airports in Serbia
 Airports of Serbia
 Transport in Serbia
 AirSerbia

Sources
  Аеродром у Сјеници највећи изазов за деминере (Politika, 21.07.2019)
  Najavljen je mogući predlog da se otkupi vojni Aerodrom u Sjenici, na tromesečni period tokom godine, kada bi služio u civilne svrhe za kargo prevoz, a u čijem okruženju bi se mogli izgraditi golf tereni, što bi, kako je rečeno, u predele skoro netaknute prirode, privuklo i strane turiste. (Danas, 29.10.2009)
  Sjenica: Ostaje vojni aerodrom (FoNet, 24.09.2009)
  Privreda Novog Pazara, koja tesno sarađuje sa Turskom, najavljivala je obnovu vojnog Aerodroma „Sjenica”, koji je takođe teško oštećen u bombardovanju. Vojska je voljna da proda taj aerodrom, ali kupaca i investitora i dalje nema. (Politika, 31.05.2009)
  TUŽNA SUDBINA AERODROMA DUBINJE KOD SJENICE - Na pisti napasaju ovce
  "Krtice" (Moles) - MiG-21s in bunker - Four MiG-21 and one G-4 Super Galeb buried in kamponir's at military airport Dubinje near Sjenica  
  U Sjenici spremni da kupe vojni aerodrom
  Aerodrom Sjenica - "Dubinje"
  Poseta predstavnika JP Aerodrom "Nikola Tesla" Aerodromu u Sjenici
  "Kontrola leta" (NIN)

External links

  Dubinje on earthsearch.net
 Sjenica Airport map

Airports in Serbia
Yugoslav Air Force bases
Sjenica